Kerstin Rehders (born 18 November 1962) is a German rower. She competed at the 1984 Summer Olympics and the 1988 Summer Olympics.

References

External links
 

1962 births
Living people
German female rowers
Olympic rowers of West Germany
Rowers at the 1984 Summer Olympics
Rowers at the 1988 Summer Olympics
People from Dormagen
Sportspeople from Düsseldorf (region)